Clare Lucy Prosser (née Thomas; born 2 April 1989) is a British actress who has appeared in several British films and television series. Some of her highest profile roles have been Aggie, one of the title character's classmates in the film Madeline, and Ingrid Dracula, daughter of the Count, in the children's television series Young Dracula. She also made an appearance in BBC One show Holby City, as the stepdaughter of a male patient.

Personal
Prosser grew up with her parents and younger sister, Sally, in Beaconsfield, and attended Beaconsfield High School, a grammar school in Buckinghamshire.

She studied in New York at the American Academy of Dramatic Arts and graduated in April 2011.

She married Tom Prosser on 17 July 2017. She give birth to their first child, daughter, Darcey in April 2019, and had their son, Jett in September 2021.

In 2020, she started a vlogging channel on YouTube where she creates videos about her daily life.

Filmography

Film

Television

References

External links 

 Clare Prosser on IMDb
 Clare Prosser on Twitter

English television actresses
English film actresses
1989 births
Living people
Actresses from Buckinghamshire
English child actresses
20th-century English actresses
21st-century English actresses